Californians Against Waste is an environmental advocacy organization that advocates for stronger environmental laws and more recycling at the state and local level. The organization was founded in 1977 and has sponsored numerous successful citizen initiatives. It is headquartered two blocks from California's state capitol in Sacramento.

According to the organization's website, "Californians Against Waste is a non-profit environmental research and advocacy organization that identifies, develops, promotes and monitors policy solutions to pollution and conservation problems posing a threat to public health and the environment. Californians Against Waste's history has demonstrated it to be the nation's oldest, largest and most effective non-profit environmental organization advocating for the implementation of waste reduction and recycling policies and programs."

Mission
The stated mission of Californians Against Waste is "to protect communities by eliminating the pollution inherent in the extraction and disposal of natural resources. CAW believes in preventing waste at its source and holding producers responsible throughout a product's lifecycle to transition California to a thriving circular economy."

History

The California Redemption Value
In 1977, a group of California environmentalists founded Californians Against Waste to organize support for beverage container recycling policies that would eventually lead to the creation of the California Redemption Value, also known by the CRV acronym found on bottles and cans. Oregon passed the nation’s first bottle bill in 1970. In 1986, CAW worked with Assemblymember Burt Margolin to sponsor and see signed into law AB 2020, which created the CRV.

E-waste in California
After personal computers and cell phones started to become widely used in California in the 1990s, a growing amount of resulting e-waste began accumulating in landfills. These electronics often contain hazardous materials, and the handling and disposal of these products created new, toxic threats to the environment and public health. In the 2000s, Californians Against Waste sponsored legislation that created retailer take-back programs for personal computers, mobile phones, rechargeable batteries and other household electronics. Today, hundreds of electronics retailers throughout the state participate in the program and accept these items for recycling, free of charge. The legislation also established limits on the amount of hazardous materials that electronics may contain, as well as efficiency standards for light bulbs that led to the phasing out of incandescent light bulbs in the state.

Expanding product stewardship
Take-back programs are based on the concept of product stewardship, and Californians Against Waste went on the apply this concept to major sources of waste besides e-waste. Since 2010, the organization has sponsored legislation that brought the PaintCare unused paint drop-off recycling program to California, and created a used mattress drop-off program  expected to take effect in early 2016.

Banning lightweight plastic grocery bags
In 2014, Californians Against Waste worked with California State Senator Alex Padilla to sponsor SB 270, legislation that would phase-out lightweight plastic bags. Environmentalists cite lightweight plastic grocery bags as a significant source of non-biodegradable environmental pollution because their lightweight nature allows them to be blown long distances by wind and eventually end up in rivers, lakes and oceans. California uses over 13 billion lightweight plastic grocery bags every year. SB 270 was signed by the governor and would have gone into effect in July 2015. However, the American Progressive Bag Alliance spent $3.2 million to collect enough signatures to qualify a referendum on SB 270. The referendum went before California voters during the November 2016 presidential election, requiring a ‘Yes’ vote to uphold the plastic bag ban and reject the referendum. The proposition was approved with 53.27% of the vote.

Acting locally
To generate support and momentum needed to pass statewide legislation, Californians Against Waste sometimes works with community groups and local governments to pass local ordinances. Before the passage of SB 270, Californians Against Waste worked with many of the over 100 cities and counties in the state that had already enacted local plastic bag bans. This work came after the organization worked at the local level to pass local beverage container deposit ordinances.

Toward zero waste
To move California closer to the goal of zero waste, Californians Against Waste worked with Assemblymember Wes Chesbro in 2014 to sponsor a new law establishing that it is the goal of the State of California to achieve a 75 percent recycling rate by 2020. This law also now requires apartment complexes with five or more units to provide residents with on-site recycling opportunities, and for certain businesses to arrange for recycling services. In addition, the organization sponsored a new law that, beginning in 2016, phases in the requirement for restaurants, grocery stores and certain other businesses to provide for the composting or anaerobic digestion of their food waste and green waste. This was subsequently expanded by the landmark SB 1383 (by State Senator Ricardo Lara) in 2016 to mandate universal composting service for all businesses and residents, and ban the disposal of edible food that can be donated, both of which go into effect in 2022.

See also
Environmental issues in the United States

References
https://www.calrecycle.ca.gov/organics/slcp

External links

Environmental organizations based in California